The women's 10,000 metres walk at the 2022 World Athletics U20 Championships was held at the Estadio Olímpico Pascual Guerrero in Cali, Colombia on 5 August 2022.

42 athletes from 30 countries entered to the competition, however, 41 of them competed. Heather Durrant, the third racewalker entered by the United States, did not compete since only two athletes per nation can compete in each event.

Records
U20 standing records prior to the 2022 World Athletics U20 Championships were as follows:

Results
The race will start at 8:30 on 5 August 2022. The results were as follows:

References

10,000 metres walk
Racewalking at the World Athletics U20 Championships